Argentine Antarctica is an area of Antarctica claimed by Argentina as part of its national territory. It consists of the Antarctic Peninsula and a triangular section extending to the South Pole, delimited by the 25° West and 74° West meridians and the 60° South parallel. This region overlaps British and Chilean claims in Antarctica. Argentina's Antarctic claim is based on its continued presence at a base on Laurie Island in the South Orkney Islands since 1904, and the area's proximity to the South American continent. Argentina's claim is subject to the Antarctic Treaty.
Administratively, Argentine Antarctica is a department of the province of Tierra del Fuego, Antarctica, and South Atlantic Islands. The provincial authorities are based in Ushuaia. Despite the claim to this Antarctic area, Argentinean authority extends no further than the nation's bases.

The Argentine exploration of the continent started early in the 20th century. José María Sobral was the first Argentine to set foot on Antarctica, in 1902, where he spent two seasons with the Swedish Antarctic Expedition of Otto Nordenskiöld. Shortly afterward, in 1904, the Orcadas Permanent Base was already fully operational. Years later, other bases would be created, some permanent and others seasonal. The first Argentine expedition to reach the South Pole was the 1965 Operación 90.

Argentine activities in Antarctica are coordinated by the Instituto Antártico Argentino (IAA) and Argentine Antarctic Program.

The ice in the glacier shell has a thickness of 2 km on average. Temperatures range from 0°C in summer and -60°C in winter, although in certain points it may drop to approximately -82°C.

Time zone UTC-3 is used as in the South American continent.

Argentina has six permanent Antarctic Stations and seven Summer Stations.

According to the last Argentine national census, in October 2010, Argentine Antarctica has 230 inhabitants (including 9 families and 16 children) at six permanent bases: 75 at Marambio, 66 at Esperanza, 33 at Carlini, 20 at San Martín, 19 at Belgrano II and 17 at Orcadas. As an official Argentine district within Tierra del Fuego Province, residents take part in general elections.

History

First expeditions 
In 1815, Guillermo Brown, an Irish-born Argentine Marine Commodore serving in the United Provinces of the Río de la Plata, launched a campaign to harass the Spanish fleet in the Pacific Ocean. When rounding Cape Horn aboard the Hercules and Trinidad, strong winds pushed them to parallel 65 S. Some Argentine sources say that Brown had sighted Antarctic land on the expedition, saying that it is the reason why Argentine cartography often calls the northernmost part of the Antarctic Peninsula Tierra de la Trinidad.

On 10 June 1829 the government of the province of Buenos Aires issued a decree creating the Political-Military Command of the Malvinas Islands (see Louis Vernet) including the islands adjacent to Cape Horn, which plays in Argentina and that included the Antarctic islands.

The Argentine government decided to join the Swedish Antarctic Expedition on 10 October 1900. This Argentine government received support, and in exchange, offered the services of the Argentine Navy to deliver scientific data and zoological collections. On the way through Buenos Aires, Lieutenant Jose Maria Sobral boarded the ship Antarctic on 21 December 1901. As no news of the expedition reached the Argentine government, it then fulfilled its commitment to support the expedition by renovating the corvette ARA Uruguay, which then set out on search on 8 October 1903, under the command of Lieutenant Julián Irizar, finding and rescuing members of the expedition who had been sheltering following the collapse of the Antarctic.

The expedition built a hut on Snow Hill Island in 1902. The Argentine Navy took possession of the hut in 1954 and named it Refugio Suecia. Currently, it is an Argentine historical monument and historical site as appointed by the Antarctic Treaty. The 1902 expedition built another hut in Hope Bay, which is also an Antarctic monument under the control of Esperanza Station.

Permanent occupation 

On 2 January 1904, Argentina acquired the weather station installed by Scotsman William Speirs Bruce, in Laurie Island in the South Orkneys, where there had been a crew of six men making scientific observations. In it was a meteorological observatory, where he also worked, a post office was installed. Civil (employee of the Argentine company official post and telegraph) Hugo Alberto Acuna accounted the hoisting for the first time in an official way the flag of Argentina on the Argentine Antarctic Sector, on 22 February 1904. Such an observatory became the Orcadas Base the oldest existing today across the Antarctic territory permanent human settlement.

The Argentine corvette ARA Uruguay returned to Antarctica in 1905 (sailed from the port of Buenos Aires on 10 December 1904) to relieve staffing of the South Orkney and refer to Deception Island and Wiencke Island in search of Jean-Baptiste Charcot, whose French Antarctic Expedition (1903–1905) was believed to be lost. Thanks to the Argentine collaboration with his expedition, Charcot named an insular group as Argentine Islands. One of these islands was named as Galindez Island in honor of the captain of the Corvette, Ismael Galíndez, and another was named Uruguay Island, in homage to the Argentine Corvette.

The Argentine Government decided to add two meteorological observatories, in the South Georgia Island and Wandel Island, who already had on the islands Laurie and Observatorio (near Isla de los Estados). Expeditions to Wandel Island failed in two attempts. In June 1905 the transport ARA Guardia Nacional under the command of the Lieutenant Alfredo P. Lamas carried forward the task of raising the Observatory in Grytviken in Cumberland Bay, renamed in Spanish Bahía Guardia Nacional.

On 30 March 1927, the first radiotelegraph station in Antarctica was inaugurated in the South Orkney Islands. On 15 December 1927, the General Directorate of Post and Telegraph from Argentina informed the International Bureau of the Universal Postal Union about their Antarctic claims and other islands of the South Atlantic.

In 1939, Argentina created temporarily (to attend a Norwegian invitation) the National Commission of the Antarctic by Decree No. 35821, but by the Decree No. 61852 of 30 April 1940 became a permanent body in order to intensify research in the area. Explorations, scientific tasks, were gathering ground and marking.

In October 1941, the Instituto Geográfico Militar published maps showing the extent of the future Argentine claim between the 25° W and 75° W. In January 1942 the Argentine Government, according to the sector theory, said their Antarctic rights between the Meridian 25° and 68°24' West (of Punta Dúngeness).

On 8 November 1942 Argentina laid claim to Antarctic land when an expedition under the command of the captain Alberto J. Oddera placed a cylinder containing a report and a flag on Deception Island. In January 1943 the British ship HMS Carnarvon Castle crew destroyed the evidence of the Argentine inauguration and planted the British flag. On 5 March of the same year the Argentine vessel ARA 1° de Mayo removed the British flag.

In 1946, the National Antarctic Commission set new limits for Argentine Antarctica between the Meridian 25° and 74° West (of the far east of the South Sandwich Islands). Chile and Argentina signed on 4 March 1948 a mutual agreement protecting and defending legal rights of the territorial Antarctic, mutually recognizing their claims.

On 7 April 1948, Decree No. 9905 settled the administrative unit of the Argentine Antarctic Sector of the maritime Governor of the National Territory of Tierra del Fuego. By her Decree No. 17040 of 9 June the "Antarctic and Malvinas Division" was created under authority of the Argentine Ministry of Foreign Affairs.

The first continental Argentine base in Antarctica, the Almirante Brown Naval detachment was opened in the year 1951. The following year opened the Esperanza Naval detachment (now Esperanza Base). While building this last base at hope Bay, occurred the first shooting war in Antarctica on 1 February 1952, when a team of coast Argentine, after a warning, fired over the heads of a burst of machine gun and forced to re-embark a civil team of the Falkland Islands Dependencies Survey unloading materials of the ship John Biscoe intending to restore the British base "D" burned down in 1948.

On 17 January 1953, at Deception Island, the Refugio Teniente Lasala (a hut and a tent) was opened by the staff of the Argentine ship ARA Chiriguano, becoming a Sergeant and a corporal of the Argentina Navy. On 15 February, in the incident of Deception Island, 32 Royal Marines of the British frigate HMS Snipe armed with Sten submachine guns, rifles, and tear gas captured two Argentine sailors. The Argentine refuge and a nearby uninhabited Chilean hut were destroyed and Argentine sailors were delivered to a vessel of that country on 18 February to South Georgia. A British detachment stayed three months on the island while the frigate patrolled the waters until April.

On 4 May 1955, the United Kingdom filed two lawsuits against Argentina and Chile respectively, the International Court of Justice in The Hague so this declared the invalidity of claims of the sovereignty of the two countries on the Antarctic and sub-Antarctic areas. On 15 July 1955, the Chilean Government rejected the jurisdiction of the Court in that case, and on 1 August, the Argentine Government did the same, by what the demands on 16 March 1956 they were archived.

On 1 December 1959, the Antarctic Treaty was signed by Argentina, Australia, Belgium, Chile, France, Japan, New Zealand, Norway, South Africa, the Union of Soviet Socialist Republics, the United Kingdom and the United States, entering into force on 23 June 1961.

In the 1960s the State of Argentina, with its fleet, pioneered ecological tourist cruises to Antarctica. At the same time, the Argentine State-owned Aerolíneas Argentinas inaugurated passenger flights between Ushuaia and Sydney making scale in Marambio Base. Between the mid-1960s and the first half of the 1970s, Argentina launched rockets from its Antarctic bases. These rockets were designed and built entirely in Argentina and possessed meteorological instrumentation and radiation sensors.

Operación 90 was the first Argentine ground expedition to the South Pole, conducted in 1965, by ten soldiers of the Argentine Army under then-Colonel Jorge Edgard Leal. The operation was named for the target 90 degree South latitude point (the geographic South Pole).

On 8 April 1970, the Governor of Tierra del Fuego issued Decree No. 149 creating 4 departments, among them the Argentine Antarctic Sector Department.

In 1977, the Esperanza Base was elected as the place of filing of Argentine families that travelled at the end of that year to overwinter at the base. The first director of the Argentine Antarctic Institute, general Hernán Pujato, was the forerunner of the installation of the Fortín Sargento Cabral when on 13 August 1954 he proposed the Argentine Government create a farmhouse out of Esperanza Base to populate it with family groups. The idea had aimed to strengthen Argentine rights in that part of Antarctica. After finishing the construction of the houses, the Fortín Sargento Cabral was inaugurated on 17 February 1978. Having then 5 houses for families who wintered there that year.

The first human born in Antarctica was the Argentine Emilio Palma at Esperanza Base in 1978, within the territory claimed by Argentina. His baptism in the Catholic chapel on 7 January 1978 was the first on the continent.

On 18 December 2012, the Foreign & Commonwealth Office of the United Kingdom announced that the southern part of British Antarctic Territory (which included a portion of Argentine Antarctica) would be named Queen Elizabeth Land in honour of the Queen. Argentina "strongly rejected" Britain's right to rename the area.

In 2013 the Argentine Defense Ministry announced that Petrel Base would become a permanent base by 2015. The base will have an airport and logistics for transfer of passengers and cargo.

Geography 

The geographic structure of Argentine Antarctica continues some features of Patagonia, located to the north of it. The highest peaks are located at the south of the Antarctic Peninsula, which has islands and archipelagos nearby. The land is under an ice sheet.

Climate

The climate of the region ranges from a subpolar climate in the north to a polar climate in the south. The region has an extremely cold climate with mean temperatures below  with frost and snowfall occurring throughout the year. In general, there are two different climatic zones found within the region: a glacial climate in the interior and an oceanic one in the Antarctic Peninsula and adjacent islands. The glacial climate found in the interior is dominated by continental ice sheets and glaciers while in the Antarctic Peninsula and its adjacent islands, the climate is characterized by very strong winds, particularly in winter. In particular, the Antarctic Peninsula experiences strong cold winds and blizzards. In the interior of the continent, the climate is colder and drier due to the higher latitude, altitude, and strong continental influences. In the warmest month, mean temperatures are usually below . Coastal areas have mean temperatures in the warmest month at around freezing. Precipitation mainly falls as snow. Due to the ice sheets and glaciers covering most of the region and the severity of the climate, the flora is sparse and limited only to coastal areas.

Symbols 

The flag of Tierra del Fuego, which includes Argentine Antarctica, was adopted in 1999 as the result of a competition. It is a diagonal bicolor of sky blue and orange with a white albatross dividing the flag diagonally and the Southern Cross in the blue upper half. The orange represents the fire in the province's name, Tierra del Fuego, meaning "Land of Fire". The blue represents the sky and reflects the color of the national flag.

Argentine bases 

Esperanza and Marambio are the largest Argentine bases, together holding 70 buildings, with a combined occupancy rate ranging from roughly 110 in winter to 250 in summer. Orcadas Base, on the South Orkney Islands was the world's first Antarctic base, operating continuously since 1903. The southernmost Argentine permanent base is Belgrano II, at latitude around 77 degrees south.

The bases are supplied by ship as well as by C-130 Hercules and DHC-6 Twin Otter aircraft.

Permanent
 Belgrano II, laboratory and meteorological station; Argentine southernmost base (since 1979)
 Belgrano III (closed)
 Esperanza, Hope Bay
Laboratory and meteorological station (since 1952)
Radio LRA36 Nacional Arcángel San Gabriel, School #38 Presidente Raúl Ricardo Alfonsín (since 1978)
Catholic Chapel, Post, Gym, Civil registration, port, tourist facilities
 Carlini, scientific station at King George Island
 Marambio Base Station, Seymour-Marambio Island
Laboratory, meteorological station
Airport, 1.2 km long, 30m wide landing track (since 1969) (Website)
 Orcadas Base, South Orkney Islands (since 1903)
 San Martín Base, laboratory and Meteorological measurements (since 1951)

Seasonal
 Teniente Camara Base (1957) , Livingston Island
 Base Deception (1948) , Deception Island
 Petrel Air Station (1967)  Dundee Island
 Base Primavera (1977) , Alexander Island
 Base Melchior (1947)  Anvers Island
 Almirante Brown Base (1951) , Paradise Bay
 Teniente Matienzo Base (1961) , Larsen Nunatak

Camps, huts and other

(64 in all)
 Base Alférez de Navío Sobral (1965) , Edith Ronne Land (now closed)
 Estación Científica Ellsworth (ex US) (1958) , Weddell Sea (now closed)
 Refuge Francisco de Gurruchaga , Nelson Island (open as hut)
 Base Ballvé , King George Island (open as hut)
 Belgrano I Base , Filchner-Ronne Ice Shelf (closed)
 Belgrano III Base , Filchner-Ronne Ice Shelf (closed)
 Camp Livingston , Byers Peninsula, Livingston Island
 Refugio Suecia , Snow Hill Island (built in February 1902 by the Swedish South Polar Expedition)
 Refuge Abrazo de Maipú , Trinity Peninsula (administered between Chile and Argentina)

Argentina's claim to the Antarctic Peninsula overlaps with the Antarctic claims of Chile, 53°W to 90°W, and the UK claims, 20°W to 80°W.

Currently, there are no attempts by Argentina or any other country to enforce territorial claims in Antarctica. See List of Antarctic territorial claims.

None of these claims have widespread international recognition.

Demographics 

In 1978, the first Antarctic baby was born in the Fortín Sargento Cabral at the Esperanza Base. He was named Emilio Palma. María de las Nieves Delgado was the first Antarctic girl, born on 27 March 1978 at Esperanza Base. By 1980,  six more children were born at the base: Rubén Eduardo de Carli (21 September 1979), Francisco Javier Sosa (21 September 1979), Silvina Analía Arnouil (14 January 1980), José Manuel Valladares Solís (24 January 1980), Lucas Daniel Posse (4 February 1980) and María Sol Cosenza (3 May 1983). The base has an Argentine civil registry office where there have been births and weddings.

In 1991, there were 142 permanent residents including 19 minors. These residents are families that live in Antarctica or scientists that have lived for more than two years. They were 121 men and 21 women that lived mostly in the colony of Esperanza and other bases. As of 1998–1999, Argentine Antarctica had a winter population of 165.

See also 

 Argentine actions in Antarctica
 Australian Antarctic Territory
 List of Antarctic territorial claims
 Ross Dependency

References

Bibliography

External links 

  Dirección Nacional del Antártico
 Argentine Bases
  Marambio Base
 Dirección Nacional del Antártico: Bases
  Argentine Antarctica History

 
Departments of Tierra del Fuego Province, Argentina
Territorial claims in Antarctica
States and territories established in the 1900s
1900s establishments in Antarctica